Akram Khodabandeh (born 25 September 1991, in Karaj) is the captain of the Iranian women's national taekwondo team.
 
She started Taekwondo in 2008 and after 9 months of training, she won the first place in the national youth team selection competitions and in 2010 she became a member of the Iranian women's national taekwondo team. She became the runner-up in The 3rd Asian University Taekwondo Championship 2011 and since then has been the champion or runner-up in various competitions including the Asian Championship, World Military Championships, Islamic Solidarity Games, World Student Games (Universiade), and since 2014 has been the captain of the Iranian women's national taekwondo team.
 
Khodabandeh is a student of mechanical engineering and is the only Iranian female taekwondo fighter to have won the Universiade.

References

1991 births
Iranian female taekwondo practitioners
Asian Games silver medalists for Iran
Asian Games medalists in taekwondo
Taekwondo practitioners at the 2014 Asian Games
Living people
Medalists at the 2014 Asian Games
Universiade medalists in taekwondo
Universiade gold medalists for Iran
Asian Taekwondo Championships medalists
Medalists at the 2015 Summer Universiade
Islamic Solidarity Games medalists in taekwondo
Islamic Solidarity Games competitors for Iran
People from Karaj
21st-century Iranian women